Orange is an American-British pop punk/punk band from Los Angeles, California, formed in 2002.

The band were first signed to Hellcat/Epitaph Records by Tim Armstrong of Rancid when they were only 16 years old and since then have toured the world with many bands such as Misfits, The Adicts, UK Subs, Rancid, Reel Big Fish, Bowling for Soup and Zebrahead and have been on several TV shows including The O.C. and The Hills; and their song "Revolution" is the theme song to Cartoon Network's show Generator Rex. They have released four albums, Welcome to the World of Orange,  Escape from LA, Phoenix, and Dead Sexy; and singles such as "Late Nights and Early Mornings" as well as a cover of "I Wish It Could Be Christmas Everyday".

Band members

Joe Dexter is the son of wealthy bassist and songwriter Paul Spencer Denman, who is the current bassist for Sade.  

James Bull is also the current drummer for British Anarcho-punk band Rubella Ballet. 

Billy Wood is also the current Bass player for London ska band Buster Shuffle and former bass player for classic punk band Sham 69. 

Danny Snow is also the guitar player for the metal band River Becomes Ocean.

Current line-up
 Joe Dexter - bass guitar and lead vocals (2002–2016) rhythm guitar and lead vocals 2017, 2019–present)
 James Bull - drums (2016, 2017, 2019–present)
 Danny Snow - lead guitar (2017, 2019–present)
 Billy Wood - bass guitar (2017, 2019–present)

Former members
 Mike Valentine - rhythm guitar (2002–2008)
 Jack Berglund - lead guitar (2002–2008)
 Jon DeRing - rhythm guitar (2008)
 Zak Glosserman - drums (2002–2014)
 Perry Ladish - rhythm guitar (2008–2014)
 Brendan Minded - lead guitar (2009)
 Alec Gomez - lead guitar (2009–2014)

Touring Members
 Brendan Minded - lead guitar (2009)
 Jon DeRing - rhythm guitar (2005)

Discography
 Rock n Roar [demo] - 2003
 Welcome to the World of Orange - 2004
 Escape from LA - 2007
 Phoenix - 2010
 Dead Sexy (EP) - 2011
 The Hardest Pill to Swallow (Single) - 2013
 Late Nights and Early Mornings (Single) - 2017
 I Wish It Could Be Christmas Everyday (Single) - 2019

References

https://www.studocu.com/ph/document/ama-computer-university/readings-in-philippine-history/orange-band-ehe/36349076
https://www.allmusic.com/artist/orange-mn0001353644
https://www.vacarm.net/albums/albums-chronique-punk/orange-escape-from-la/

Punk rock groups from California
Pop punk groups from California
Hellcat Records artists
Musical groups established in 2004
Musical groups from Los Angeles
2004 establishments in California